The 2018–19 SFA South Region Challenge Cup was the 12th edition of the annual cup competition for senior non-league clubs in the central and southern regions of Scotland. This season saw the competition increase to 69 teams from the 42 who took part in 2017–18, thanks to the addition of 26 clubs to the East of Scotland Football League and the return of Wigtown and Bladnoch.

The defending champions were Civil Service Strollers, who beat BSC Glasgow 2-1 after extra time in the final on 20 May 2018. However they were eliminated in the fourth round by Newtongrange Star.

East Kilbride won 2-1 against Bonnyrigg Rose Athletic in the final to secure the South Challenge Cup for a second time, completing a double with the Lowland League title.

Format 
The competition featured 69 teams from the Lowland Football League (16), East of Scotland Football League (38), South of Scotland Football League (14), as well as SFA member club Glasgow University of the Caledonian Amateur Football League. The reserve teams of Stirling University, Annan Athletic, and Stranraer do not take part.

The draw is unseeded, with matches proceeding to extra time and penalties if they are tied after 90 minutes.

Calendar

First round
The first round took place on Saturday 25 August 2018. The draw for the first and second rounds took place at the East of Scotland Football Association's AGM on Thursday 7 June 2018. 59 clubs received a bye to the second round, with 10 taking part in the first round.

Notes

Second round
The second round took place on the weekend of Saturday 15 September 2018. The four winners from the first round, along with Upper Annandale who progressed after Selkirk withdrew, joined the 59 clubs who received a bye.

Notes

Third round
The third round took place on Saturday 13 October 2018, although five matches were postponed until the fourth round date. The draw was made at Hampden Park on Friday 21 September 2018.

Fourth round
The fourth round took place on Saturday 10 November 2018, although due to postponements three ties were held at a later date.

Draw
The draw was made at Hampden Park on 17 October 2018 by John Gold of the Scottish Schools Football Association and Fiona McIntyre of the Scottish Womens Football Association.

Teams in Italics were not known at the time of the draw. Teams in Bold advanced to the quarter-finals.

Matches

Quarter-finals
The quarter-finals took place on Saturday 2 March 2019.

Draw
The draw was made at Hampden Park on 14 November 2018. 

Teams in Italics were not known at the time of the draw. Teams in Bold advanced to the semi-finals.

Matches

Semi-finals
The semi-finals took place on Saturday 6 April 2019.

Draw
 

Teams in Bold advanced to the final.

Matches

Final
The final was played on Sunday 26 May 2019 at Meggetland Stadium in Edinburgh, between the champions of the Lowland League and East of Scotland League.

References

2018–19 in Scottish football cups
South Challenge Cup seasons